Rakesh Singh (born 4 June 1962) is an Indian politician and a Member of Parliament in the 17th Lok Sabha. He is member of the Bharatiya Janata Party. He has been representing the Jabalpur constituency of Madhya Pradesh since 2004 general elections. He was appointed as the BJP State President of Madhya Pradesh unit on 18 April 2018 replacing Nandkumar Singh Chauhan, who had been at the helm since August 2014 and in turn was then replaced by V. D. Sharma in February 2020.

He was appointed as the Chief Whip of the Bharatiya Janata Party in the Lok Sabha in 2016, replacing Arjun Ram Meghwal who was inducted into the Modi government. He is working as the chairman of the Parliamentary Standing Committee on Coal and Steel. Singh is also an active member of various other parliamentary committees. He holds the position of Co Incharge of Maharastra unit.

Personal life
Singh was born in Jabalpur, Madhya Pradesh to Surendra Singh and Gomti Devi. He has an elder brother Shantanu Singh. He graduated with a Bachelor of Science degree from Government Science College, Jabalpur. He married Mala Singh in December 1993, with whom he has two daughters.

References

External links

1962 births
Living people
People from Jabalpur
India MPs 2004–2009
India MPs 2009–2014
Lok Sabha members from Madhya Pradesh
India MPs 2014–2019
Politicians from Varanasi
Bharatiya Janata Party politicians from Madhya Pradesh